Public Service Broadcasting is a London-based musical group consisting of four musicians known mainly by their stage names: J. Willgoose, Esq. on guitar, banjo, other stringed instruments, samplings and electronic musical instruments; Wrigglesworth on drums, piano and electronic musical instruments; J F Abraham on flugelhorn, bass guitar, drums and assorted other instruments including a vibraslap; and Mr B on visuals and set design for live performances. The band has toured internationally and in 2015 was announced as a nominee in the Vanguard breakthrough category of the fourth annual Progressive Music Awards, staged by Prog magazine, which they won.

History
At first, the band consisted solely of Willgoose. He made his public debut at The Selkirk pub in Tooting, London, England in August 2009.  Shortly afterwards he issued EP One.  Teaming up with Wrigglesworth on drums, the band played its first festival in September 2010, Aestival in Suffolk, and work began on a second EP, The War Room, which was released in May 2012.  Since then, the band has released four albums, Inform-Educate-Entertain (2013); The Race for Space (2015); Every Valley (2017); and Bright Magic (2021). The Race for Space was supported by two shows at the National Space Centre in Leicester celebrating the album's launch. The album charted just outside the top 10 in 11th place in the UK in its release week and reaching Number 1 in the UK Independent Charts for that week. A follow-up EP was released at the tail end of 2015 (Sputnik/Korolev) which was backed up by a UK tour, climaxing in the band's biggest headline show, a sold-out night at the O2 Academy Brixton, of which a live album was released in 2016. While writing The War Room the band formed a close relationship with the British Film Institute, using their material during live shows.

On 10 March 2017, PSB released a new single titled Progress featuring vocals from Tracyanne Campbell from Camera Obscura with photo shoots showing the band as a three-piece with new member JF Abraham featured on promotional photos. Their third studio album, entitled Every Valley, about the coal mining industry's rise and fall in the Welsh Valleys between the 1950s and 1980s, was released on 7 July 2017. As with The Race for Space, the band had two album launch concerts, this time in Ebbw Vale, where the LP was recorded.

In June 2018, PSB appeared at the BBC Music "Big Weekend", playing at the Titanic Quarter in Belfast. These tracks were released as the EP White Star Liner on 26 October 2018.

They performed a "specially commissioned new arrangement" of The Race for Space on 25 July 2019 in a late-night Prom, joined by London Contemporary Voices and the Multi-Story Orchestra, the performance being shown on BBC television the following night.

In December 2020, Willgoose released ambient solo EP A Wonderful Hope under the name Late Night Final. This release on PIAS Recordings is a record which featured soundscape artist Teddy Hunter on the track "The Human Touch".

On 2 June 2021, PSB debuted the first single, called "People, Let’s Dance" from their fourth studio album "Bright Magic".

On 30 August 2022, PSB played a specially commissioned, album length, piece for Prom 58 called 'This New Noise', with the BBC Symphony Orchestra at the Royal Albert Hall in London. It was commissioned to celebrate 100 years of the BBC. At the time of the performance the band said there were currently no plans to tour the piece, or to release it as a record - but they hinted that this may not be set in stone.

In January 2023 J. Willgoose Esq. created a creator site using the Patreon platform in order to share updates and content with fans. The first track released on this site was "Three Things", which was the first ever Public Service Broadcasting demo.

Music style and live performances

The band mostly plays instrumental music; Willgoose has said that "singing is never going to work. I'm not going to be happy with it, I'm not going to be comfortable playing it to other people." They take samples from old public information films, archive footage and propaganda material. Despite Willgoose's prior reservations about singing, he did later contribute vocals to the duet piece "You + Me" from Every Valley, because the intended vocalist was not available.

Members 
Musical members

 J. Willgoose Esq. – guitar, bass, banjo, other stringed instruments, samplings and electronic musical instruments, vocals (2009–present)
 Wrigglesworth – drums, piano, electronic musical instruments, saxophone (2010–present)
 J F Abraham – flugelhorn, bass guitar, drums, assorted other instruments including a vibraslap, electronic musical instruments, arrangements (2016–present; session contributions 2014–2015) 

Non-musical members

 Mr B – visuals and set design for live performances.

Instruments and equipment

Discography

Studio albums

Remix albums

Live albums

EPs

Singles
 "ROYGBIV" – 5 March 2012 which won the BBC Radio 6 Music Rebel Playlist.
 "Spitfire" – 26 March 2012 which won the BBC Radio 6 Music Rebel Playlist. The song sampled dialogue and sound from the 1942 film "The First of the Few", and the video incorporated footage from the same film.
 "London Can Take It" – 13 August 2012
 "Everest" – 12 November 2012 only for digital downloading. The song is based around The Conquest of Everest, a 1953 film charting Sir Edmund Hillary and Tenzing Norgay's first successful ascent of the mountain.
 "Signal 30"
 "Night Mail"
 "Elfstedentocht" (Record Store Day single; 11 November 2013)
 "Gagarin" – 1 December 2014 (first single of the album "The Race For Space")
 "Go!" – 23 February 2015
 "Sputnik/Korolev" – 20 November 2015 No. 4 UK Physical
 "Progress" – 10 March 2017 (first single of the band's third album) 
 "They Gave Me a Lamp"
 "People Will Always Need Coal"
 "White Star Liner"
 "People, Let’s Dance" (feat. EERA)
 "Blue Heaven"
 "Lichtspiel III: Symphonie Diagonale"
 "Der Rhythmus der Maschinen"

Online Releases
 "Three Things" – 4 January 2023
 "Shy Guy" - 3 February 2023

Notes

Notes

References

External links

Public Service Broadcasting on BBC Music
Public Service Broadcasting on MusicBrainz
Public Service Broadcasting on Discogs

Musical groups from London
English synth-pop groups
Musical groups established in 2010
2010 establishments in England
British musical trios